Tyrone Brunson (born January 29, 1985) is an American professional boxer, notable for holding the record of the most consecutive first-round knockouts for over 6 years (8 March 2008 – 6 July 2014).

Amateur career
Brunson hails from Philadelphia, Pennsylvania and comes from a long line of middleweight boxers from the city. His amateur career extended over 90 fights, finishing with a record of 82–12.

Professional career
Brunson turned professional in 2005 with a KO victory over Kevin Carey in a fight which lasted just 25 seconds. He had 7 more fights that year, all of which ended in 1st-round KO victories for Brunson. As with his debut 4 of those fights lasted less than 30 seconds, with his quickest victory coming in just 17 seconds against Terry Rork.

Brunson's KO streak continued into 2006, where in his first fight of the year he defeated James Morrow for the Mid American middleweight title.

On June 24, 2017, Brunson scored the biggest win of his career against seasoned veteran Kermit Cintron, a respected and dangerous puncher. In Philly's Fight of the Year, Brunson overcame two knockdowns to put Cintron on the floor three times to win by KO.

Chasing the record
By early 2007 Brunson's record had improved to 14–0, with all of his victories coming in the 1st round, and he was closing in on the unofficial North American record for consecutive 1st-round KOs held by Arthur "Young Otto" Susskind, who was credited with 15 consecutive 1st-round KO victories in the early 20th century. The major difference between Brunson's and Otto's streaks is that Brunson's began with his pro debut whereas Otto's streak did not start until well into his pro career.

On March 9, 2007, he equaled Otto's record when he KO'd David Johnson after 52 seconds of the 1st round. Brunson's record equaling effort was almost foiled due to a bizarre accident: Early in the bout Johnson managed to get tangled up with referee Dale Grable, which caused him to fall and injure his ankle. Despite only being able to limp around the ring he indicated to the referee that he wished to continue and the bout restarted. A few seconds later Johnson was legitimately knocked down with a barrage of punches from Brunson. This time he decided that his ankle injury was too painful and chose not to continue. As the second knockdown was as a result of a punch and not a slip the referee ruled the bout a TKO victory for Brunson (Had Johnson decided his ankle injury was too severe to continue when it first happened, the bout would have been ruled a No Contest).

Brunson claimed the North American record as his own on May 5, 2007, by KO’ing Tony Watson after just 100 seconds of the 1st round, moving his record to a perfect 16–0. The next milestone in his sights was the world record held by Edwin Valero of Venezuela with 18 consecutive 1st-round KOs. Brunson equalled Valero's total with a victory over Jamie Waru at the Sky City Casino in Auckland, New Zealand on June 8, 2007, and on March 8, 2008, recorded his record-breaking 19th consecutive 1st-round KO when he defeated Francis McKechnai in just 72 seconds at the Soaring Eagle Casino in Michigan.

On 15 August 2008 Brunson's run of consecutive 1st-round KO victories was brought to a halt at 19 when, in his 20th pro fight, he was held to a draw in a 6-round contest against Mexican journeyman Antonio Soriano. The decision was greeted with a chorus of boos from the attending audience, who felt that Soriano had done enough to gain the victory 

On December 4, 2009, Brunson fought Carson Jones. Brunson had a great first two rounds (of a 10-round fight) sticking Jones with hard, straight jabs. His luck changed in the third round. Jones hit Brunson with a great combo, knocking him down for the first time in his career. Jones continued to pound on Brunson until Brunson was no longer defending himself, the referee then stopped the match, declaring Jones the winner by TKO.

On November 10, 2013, Yemeni minimumweight Boxer Ali Raymi broke Brunson's record by scoring his 20th consecutive first-round knockout.

On October 31, 2015, Brunson suffered a decision loss to undefeated prospect Caleb Plant in A PBC Undercard.

Criticism
The main criticism leveled at Brunson by some boxing pundits and fans  is the extremely poor level of opposition he has faced while making his way to the record. In contrast with Valero, whose first 18 opponents had a combined record of 112-102-17 (1.1 win rate), the combined record of Brunson's opponents was just 60-94-8 (0.6 win rate). Furthermore, of those 18 opponents just 1 had a winning record and 6 had failed to win a single fight in their careers.

2017 resurgence 
After suffering from  a string of consecutive losses (2014–2015), Brunson scored two consecutive upset wins in 2017 against Brandon Quarles & former IBF Welterweight World Champion Kermit Cintron.

Professional boxing record

References

External links
Official Web Site
 

1985 births
Living people
Boxers from Philadelphia
American male boxers
Light-middleweight boxers
Middleweight boxers
African-American boxers
21st-century African-American sportspeople
20th-century African-American people